Amir Hossein Sedghi is an Iranian football defender who currently plays for Iranian football club FC Mashhad in the Persian Gulf Pro League.

Club career
Sedghi started his career with Siah Jamegan from youth levels. He made his professional debut for Siah Jamegan on August 13, 2015 in 1-0 win against Naft Tehran as a starter.

Club career statistics

References

External links
 Amir Hossein Sedghi at IranLeague.ir

1996 births
Living people
Iranian footballers
Sportspeople from Mashhad
Siah Jamegan players
Zob Ahan Esfahan F.C. players
Persian Gulf Pro League players
Association football fullbacks
20th-century Iranian people
21st-century Iranian people